Kohila (formerly also Kapa-Kohila) is a borough in Rapla County, northern Estonia. It is the administrative center of Kohila Parish. Kohila has a population of 3,505 (as of 1 January 2006).

Kohila has a railway station on the Tallinn - Viljandi railway line operated by Elron (rail transit).

The former name of the borough "Kapa-Kohila" is used as a synonym for "middle of nowhere" or to name any random place in Estonia.

History

Kohila manor
Kohila manor dates back to at least 1438. During its long history, the estate has belonged to various Baltic German families, including the Wrangel family, who owned it for more than 200 years. The present-day building originally dates from the early 19th century, but was heavily rebuilt after being burnt by rioters during the Revolution of 1905. Fourteen of the rioters were shot to death by Russian troops, and the lord of the manor, shaken by the events, shortly afterwards decided to sell the estate to a paper pulp factory.

Nowadays in Kohila there is a place named Tohisoo. Earlier Tohisoo manor was located there.

Economy
Kohila is the location of Kohila plywood mill, operated by Kohila Vineer OÜ, a subsidiary of Latvijas Finieris.

Gallery

Notable residents
Theodor Altermann (1885–1915), actor, theatre director and producer
Vaiko Eplik (born 1981), singer and composer
Indrek Hirv (born 1956), poet and artist
Enar Jääger (born 1984), footballer
Enver Jääger (born 1982), footballer
Rait-Riivo Laane (born 1993), basketball player
Birgit Õigemeel (born 1988), singer
Kristjan Rahnu (born 1979), decathlete

References

External links
Kohila Parish 

Boroughs and small boroughs in Estonia
Former municipalities of Estonia
Kreis Harrien